Richard John Terrile (born March 22, 1951, in New York) is a Voyager scientist who discovered several moons of Saturn, Uranus, and Neptune. He works for NASA's Jet Propulsion Laboratory.

Terrile is a supporter of the simulation hypothesis, the idea that our reality is a computer-generated virtual reality created by unknown programmers.

References

American astronomers
Planetary scientists
Living people
1951 births
Scientists from New York (state)